Ladislav Dvořáček (27 June 1923 - January 2015) FRPSL was a Czech philatelist who was appointed to the Roll of Distinguished Philatelists in 2000. He was a fellow of the Royal Philatelic Society of London, president of the Union of Czechoslovak  Philatelists, and president of the International Federation of Philately.

References

Signatories to the Roll of Distinguished Philatelists
Fellows of the Royal Philatelic Society London
1923 births
2015 deaths
Czechoslovak philatelists
Place of birth missing
Place of death missing